The Special Honours Lists for Australia are announced by the Sovereign and Governor-General at any time.

Some honours are awarded by other countries where King Charles III is the Head of State and Australians receiving those honours are listed here with the relevant reference.

This list also incorporates the Mid Winters Day honours list and the Bravery honours lists.

Order of Australia

Officer of the Order of Australia (AO)
Honorary Military
 Major General Kelvin Khong – 8 February 2023 – For distinguished service in fostering the military relationship between the Republic of Singapore and Australia through strategic vision, outstanding personal commitment and exceptional leadership, and in recognition of his role in supporting Australia during times of great need.

Medal of the Order of Australia (OAM)
Honorary General
 Jennifer Jean Macaulay - 8 February 2023 - For service to the community of Portarlington, Victoria, particularly through educational and cultural initiatives.
 Pierre Seillier - 8 February 2023 - For service to commemorating Australia's military service, particularly during World War I at the Western Front at Fromelles, France.

Royal Victorian Order

Commander of the Royal Victorian Order (CVO)
 Her Excellency The Honourable Linda Dessau,  – Governor of Victoria. Awarded as part of the 2023 New Year Honours
 Her Honour The Honourable Vicki O'Halloran,  – Administrator of the Northern Territory. Awarded as part of the 2023 New Year Honours

Lieutenant of the Royal Victorian Order (LVO)
 Colonel Michael John Miller,  – Official Secretary to the Governor of New South Wales, Australia. Awarded as part of the 2023 New Year Honours

Most Excellent Order of the British Empire

Commander of the Order of the British Empire (CBE)
 Professor John Mitchell Finnis,  – Professor and Legal Academic. For services to Legal Scholarship. Awarded as part of the 2023 New Year Honours

Order of St John

Knight of the Order of St John
 His Honour The Honourable Hugh Heggie,  – 5 February 2023 - On his appointment as the Administrator of the Northern Territory.

References

External links
Special Honours Lists, Governor General of Australia

Orders, decorations, and medals of Australia
2023 awards in Australia